The Old Curiosity Shop is a 1921 British silent drama film directed by Thomas Bentley and starring Mabel Poulton, William Lugg and Hugh E. Wright. It is based on the 1841 novel The Old Curiosity Shop by Charles Dickens. Bentley remade the novel as a sound film in 1934.

Cast 
 Mabel Poulton as Little Nell
 William Lugg as Grandfather
 Hugh E. Wright as Tom Codlin
 Pino Conti as Daniel Quilp
 Bryan Powley as Single Gentleman
 Barry Livesey as Tom Scott
 Cecil Bevan as Sampson Brass
 Beatie Olna Travers as Sally Brass
 Minnie Rayner as Mrs. Jarley
 Dennis Harvey as Short Trotters
 Dezma du May as Mrs. Quilp
 Colin Craig as Dick Swiveller
 Fairy Emlyn as Mr. Marton
 A. Harding Steerman as Mr. Marton

References

External links 
 

1921 films
1920s historical drama films
British historical drama films
1920s English-language films
Films directed by Thomas Bentley
Films based on The Old Curiosity Shop
Films set in England
Films set in the 19th century
British silent feature films
British black-and-white films
1921 drama films
1920s British films
Silent drama films